Helga Margrét Þorsteinsdóttir (born 15 November 1991 in Reykjavík) is an Icelandic heptathlete. She holds the national women indoor record in pentathlon, 4.298 points, set in Tallinn 2012.

Achievements

Personal life
Helga Margrét is the sister of  basketball player and power lifter Guðrún Gróa Þorsteinsdóttir.

References

External links

1991 births
Living people
Helga Margret Thorsteinsdottir
Helga Margret Thorsteinsdottir